Sir Malachy Joseph Higgins  (born 30 October 1944) is a retired Northern Ireland Lord Justice of Appeal.

Education
He was educated at St MacNissi's College, Garron Tower; Queen's University Belfast (LLB) and Middle Temple (BL).

Legal background
 Called to the Northern Ireland Bar, 1969 (Bencher, 1993)
 Called to the Irish Bar, 1978
 Named QC (Northern Ireland), 1985
 Served as County Court Judge, 1988–1993
 Served as Recorder of Londonderry, 1990 to 1993
 Served as County Court Judge for County Armagh, 1993.
 Judge in Residence, QUB, 1999–present

Privy Council
On 25 January 2007, Higgins was "sworn of Her Majesty’s most honourable Privy Council on his appointment as a Lord Justice of Appeal in Northern Ireland."

Queen's University Belfast
Sir Malachy Higgins was Chairman of the Queen's University Belfast's Board of Visitors from 2008 to 2013.

References

External links
 Privy Council website
 Northern Ireland Court System site
 JSBNI website
 Queen's University Belfast website
 The Times mention of Sir Malachy Higgins

1944 births
Living people
Alumni of Queen's University Belfast
Knights Bachelor
Members of the Privy Council of the United Kingdom
20th-century King's Counsel
21st-century King's Counsel
Lords Justice of Appeal of Northern Ireland
High Court judges of Northern Ireland
Northern Ireland King's Counsel